Dandya is a genus of about four species of flowering plants, all endemic to Mexico. In the APG III classification system, it is placed in the  asparagus family, and the cluster lily subfamily (formerly the family Themidaceae).

Dandya balsensis A.R.López-Ferrari & Espejo - central and southern Mexico
Dandya hannibalii L.W.Lenz - Michoacán
Dandya purpusii (Brandegee) H.E.Moore - Coahuila
Dandya thadhowardii L.W.Lenz - Michoacán, Guerrero

References

Asparagaceae genera
Brodiaeoideae
Endemic flora of Mexico